Thani bin Ahmed Al Zeoudi is the present Minister of State for Foreign Trade of the United Arab Emirates. He has a DBA in Project and Programme Management from Skema Business School, a master's degree in Project Management from the British University in Dubai, a master's degree in Business Administration from New York Institute of Technology and a bachelor's degree in Petroleum Engineering from the University of Tulsa. He was the Minister of Climate Change and Environment from February 2016 to July 2020.

References

Government ministers of the United Arab Emirates
New York Institute of Technology alumni
University of Tulsa alumni
Living people
Year of birth missing (living people)